Boris Koretsky (born 1 January 1961) is a Soviet fencer. He won a gold medal in the team foil event at the 1988 Summer Olympics.

References

External links
 

1961 births
Living people
Ukrainian male foil fencers
Azerbaijani male foil fencers
Soviet male foil fencers
Olympic fencers of the Soviet Union
Fencers at the 1988 Summer Olympics
Olympic gold medalists for the Soviet Union
Olympic medalists in fencing
Medalists at the 1988 Summer Olympics